Aero Cóndor, also known as Aero Condor Peru, is an airline based in Lima, the capital of Peru. It was founded and started operations in 1975, and provides domestic charter flights, cargo, scenic, and air ambulance services. Its main hub is Jorge Chávez International Airport in Lima.

History 
Aero Cóndor operated an extensive domestic network of more than fifteen destinations until June 2008, when most scheduled services were suspended due to the high fuel prices. On the same month, the Peruvian Ministry of Transportation and Communications ordered the grounding of Aero Cóndor fleet of Boeing 737 airliners due to safety concerns as these aircraft had been recently involved in several incidents. Nowadays, the company only serves scenic and charter flight.

Operations 
The company is only active at the domain of scenic tourist flights and charter flights.

Former scheduled destinations 

Ceased in 2008:

 Arequipa (Rodríguez Ballón International Airport)
 Ayacucho (Coronel FAP Alfredo Mendivil Duarte Airport)
 Cajamarca (Major General FAP Armando Revoredo Iglesias Airport)
 Chiclayo (FAP Captain José Abelardo Quiñones González International Airport)
 Cusco (Alejandro Velasco Astete International Airport)
 Iquitos (Crnl. FAP Francisco Secada Vignetta International Airport)
 Juliaca (Inca Manco Capac International Airport)
 Lima (Jorge Chavez International Airport)
 Piura (Cap. FAP Guillermo Concha Iberico International Airport)
 Pucallpa (Captain Rolden International Airport)
 Puerto Maldonado (Padre Aldamiz International Airport)
 Tacna (Crnl. FAP Carlos Ciriani Santa Rosa International Airport)
 Talara (Cap. FAP Víctor Montes Arias Airport)
 Trujillo (Cap. FAP Carlos Martínez de Pinillos International Airport)
 Tumbes (Cap. FAP Pedro Canga Rodríguez Airport)

Fleet 

The Aero Condor Peru fleet consists of the following aircraft (as of March 2010):

 1 × Antonov An-24RV
 1 × Antonov An-26
 3 × Cessna 208B Grand Caravan
 1 × Fokker F27-100
 1 × Fokker F27-200
 1 × Fokker 50

References

Sources

External links

 Aero Cóndor  (archive)

Airlines of Peru
Airlines established in 1975